Darren Harriott (born 1 September 1988) is a British stand-up comedian from Oldbury, West Midlands. He was nominated for the Best Newcomer Award and Best Show Award at the Edinburgh Fringe Festival in 2017 and 2019 respectively.

Early life 
Harriott was born to parents Patrick and Paulette, and grew up in Oldbury, near Birmingham in the West Midlands. His father was a drug dealer who was incarcerated throughout Harriott's childhood. He died by suicide while Harriott was still a child.

Career 
Harriott moved to London at the age of 26 to pursue a career in comedy. He worked as a security guard at venues including the Hammersmith Apollo to finance his early years.

Harriott has toured the UK with his shows "Visceral" and "Good Heart Yute," and regularly appears at comedy clubs across the country. His stand-up shows became the basis for his BBC Radio 4 series Darren Harriott’s Black Label.

Harriott has appeared on multiple television shows such as Live at the Apollo, The Last Leg, Ghost Bus Tours, Hey Tracey, Comedy Games Night, 8 Out of 10 Cats, The Apprentice: You’re Fired!, Great British Bake Off: An Extra Slice, Catchpoint for Sport Relief, University Challenge for Comic Relief, CelebAbility, The Stand Up Sketch Show, Jon Richardson: Ultimate Worrier, Celebrity Mastermind, Pointless Celebrities, Dave Gorman: Terms and Conditions Apply, Dave’s Comedian’s Against Living Miserably, Comedy Central Live, Roast Battle, Mock the Week, Comedy Central at the Comedy Store, Hypothetical, Russell Howard’s Stand Up Central, Don't Hate the Playaz, Love Island, and The Comedy Bus.

On radio he has hosted Newsjack Unplugged, Comedy of the Week for BBC Radio 4 and the BBC Radio 4 Summer Festival. Radio appearances include BBC Radio 4 shows Best of the Fest and The Now Show, and BBC Radio 5 Live comedy sports panel show Fighting Talk.

He appeared on Dave's Campaign Against Living Miserably, where he discussed his father's incarceration and death.

In late 2021, Harriott co-presented the Dave travelogue British as Folk alongside fellow comedians Ivo Graham and Fern Brady. In 2022, he was a regular panellist on Love Island's companion show Aftersun. In 2023, Harriott was a contestant on the fifteenth series of Dancing on Ice.

Filmography

References

Living people
Comedians from Birmingham, West Midlands
1988 births
Black British male comedians
British people of Jamaican descent
21st-century British comedians